Samipaşazade Sezai (1859 – 1936) was a Turkish educator, politician, diplomat and writer, who was one of the leading lights of the Turkish Romantic period. He also served as the ambassador to Spain  and later Switzerland during the First World War.

References 

1859 births
1936 deaths
Diplomats from Istanbul
19th-century writers from the Ottoman Empire
20th-century Turkish politicians
Turkish educators
Turkish writers